Hugo Olavi Niskanen (8 September 1920 – 4 December 2014) was a Finnish former long-distance runner who competed in the 1952 Summer Olympics. He was born in Kaavi.

Niskanen died in Outokumpu at age 94.

References

1920 births
2014 deaths
Finnish male long-distance runners
Olympic athletes of Finland
Athletes (track and field) at the 1952 Summer Olympics
People from Kaavi
Sportspeople from North Savo
20th-century Finnish people
21st-century Finnish people